Celtis conferta subsp. amblyphylla, commonly known as cotton wood or cotton-wood, is a flowering plant in the hemp and hackberry family.

Description
The round, purple fruits are 4 mm in diameter.

Distribution and habitat
The subspecies is endemic to Australia's subtropical Lord Howe Island in the Tasman Sea. There it is widespread in lowland forest. The only other subspecies, C. c. subsp. conferta, is endemic to New Caledonia.

References

External links

conferta subsp. amblyphylla
Endemic flora of Lord Howe Island
Plants described in 1875
Rosales of Australia
Plant subspecies
Taxa named by Ferdinand von Mueller